The Guthridge Nunataks are a scattered group of sharp peaked nunataks and small mountains, about  long and  wide, midway between the Rathbone Hills and the Blanchard Nunataks in the Gutenko Mountains of central Palmer Land, Antarctica. They were mapped by the United States Geological Survey in 1974, and named by the Advisory Committee on Antarctic Names (US-ACAN) after Guy G. Guthridge, Director of the Polar Information Service, Division of Polar Programs, National Science Foundation; Editor, US-ACAN, from 1989 (Chairman from 1994).

References

Nunataks of Palmer Land